Thar is a 2022 Indian Hindi-language neo-Western action thriller film written and directed by Raj Singh Chaudhary and produced by Anil Kapoor and Harshvardhan Kapoor. Set in the 80s, Thar follows a city man who moves to a village located in the wilderness for some exploration work, but there is more to him than meets the eye. It stars Anil Kapoor, Harshvardhan Kapoor, and Fatima Sana Shaikh.

It released on Netflix on 6 May 2022, to mixed to positive reviews from critics, who praised the direction, cinematography, performances, dialogues, background score, and its homages to the Western genre, though some criticized its predictable story, screenplay, and editing.

Plot
In 1985, Siddharth Kumar, a mysterious antique dealer, travels through Munabao, a remote Rajasthani village situated in the Thar desert near the Pakistan border, that has been rocked recently by violent killings. As Inspector of Munabao, Surekha Singh, investigates these killings, when he crosses paths with Siddharth.
When Surekha finds out about the murders in the village, while investigating he comes to a conclusion that it was the dacoits who mercilessly killed a family for drugs not for the money collected for dowry as that family's only living person- the daughter claims.
Someone kills Suva, a villager and hang his body on a tree. All policemen believe it was same gang of dacoits but Surekha believes it is not the case considering Suva was tortured and  mutilated before being hanged. 
Panna is frustrated because of Chetna's infertility and does not like Siddharth's frequent visit to their home. He beats Chetna because of this.
Siddharth finds friends of Suva - Panna, Dhana and Kanwar. He asks Panna and Kanwar for a job to transport antiques to Delhi. On the way Siddharth abducts them and keeps them at fort outside of the village. He comes back to village and sleeps with Panna's wife Chetna. While he intends to leave village next day, Chetna plans to leave with him. Dhana's wife suspects something wrong and reports to Surekha. 
While investigating further about Siddharth, it is then revealed that his wife/girlfriend was similarly tortured and mutilated by these friends in Delhi and this entire story of murdering them all was Siddharth's revenge plot. 
When Surekha is going to fort to arrest Siddharth, he is attacked by the gang of dacoits in which he successfully kills them all, survives and reaches fort.
Meanwhile Siddharth tells everything to Chetna and burns her husband Panna in front of her. When Surekha asks him to surrender, Chetna kills Siddharth. 
After 6 months we see Chetna pregnant and Surekha recovering injuries he had.

Cast
Anil Kapoor as Inspector Surekha Singh
Harshvardhan Kapoor as Siddharth Kumar
Fatima Sana Shaikh as Chetna
Jitendra Joshi as Panna
 Akshay Oberoi as Arjun Singh
Satish Kaushik as Bhure
Mukti Mohan as Gauri
Rahul Singh as Dacoit Hanif Khan
Mandana Karimi as Cheryl

Reception 
Pooja Biraia Jaiswal of The Week gave the film a rating of 3.5/5 stars and wrote "Thars gripping atmospherics, set in 1985, is captured evocatively by Shreya Dev Dube, as the narrative unfolds in the desert's grim expanse". Taran Adarsh of Bollywood Hungama gave the film a rating of 3.5/5 stars and wrote "Thar is a surprise of the season and worth watching for its plot, direction, music score and the never before seen locales of Rajasthan". Peter Bradshaw of The Guardian gave the film a rating of 3/5 stars and wrote "There are hints of Sergio Leone and Cormac McCarthy in this Rajasthan-set mystery starring the actor and his son". Bharathi Pradhan of Lehren gave the film a rating of 3/5 stars and stated "Cruel & Compelling". Renuka Vyavahare of The Times Of India gave the film a rating of 3/5 stars and wrote "Anil Kapoor's film choices are only getting better and bolder with age. Be it Thar or AK vs AK, he's showing the millennials and OTT clan what a certified movie star is made of". Reubyn Coutinho of Netflix Junkie wrote "Shots of the sprawling desert landscape give one that classic western feel that can transport them back in time to the classic westerns or even the spaghetti westerns." Prateek Sur of Outlook India gave the film a rating of 3/5 stars and wrote "While Chaudhary has made a great attempt at bringing forth a dark neo-noir thriller, but in his haste to keep it under two hours, he has just squandered a great plot at hand".

Anna MM Vetticad of Firstpost gave the film a rating of 2.75/5 stars and wrote "Anil Kapoor's quiet charisma and innate appeal keep the film going even when its writing enters shallow waters". Saibal Chatterjee of NDTV gave the film a rating of 2.5/5 stars and wrote "Kapoor Sr delivers a restrained performance, and Kapoor Jr finds himself tackling a role that appears to be right up his narrow alley. Fatima Sana Shaikh is sultry and smouldering by turns". Shubhra Gupta of The Indian Express gave the film a rating of 2.5/5 stars and wrote "This is one of those films where the setting is the real hero-- the 'Marusthal' (desert) stretching as far as the eye can see, crumbling forts, bare trees providing meagre shade, implacable, hard beauty". Sukanya Verna of Rediff gave the film a rating of 2.5/5 stars and wrote "Thar fails to ignite any excitement on screen". Avinash Lohana of Pinkvilla gave the film a rating of 2.5/5 stars and wrote "Thar had immense potential and manages to retain a lot of it too, but what disappoints is the lack of enough twists, predictable turns and dispensable additions to the story". Gautaman Bhaskaran of News18 gave the film a rating of 2/5 stars and wrote "Anil Kapoor as the cop frustrated that he has not been able to rise in the ranks, does a decent job. But there is not much coming from Kapoor's son". Soumya Srivastava of The Hindustan Times stated "Anil Kapoor outshines son Harsh Varrdhan Kapoor in the film, which begins as a Western set in Rajasthan but soon descends into torture porn genre".

References

External links 
 
 

2020s Hindi-language films
2022 films
Indian neo-noir films
Indian direct-to-video films
Indian Western (genre) films
Indian action thriller films
Hindi-language Netflix original films
Films set in deserts
Films set in the 1980s
Films set in Rajasthan